The 1998 United States Senate election in North Dakota was held on November 3, 1998, along with other elections to the United States Senate as well as elections to the United States House of Representatives and various state and local elections. Incumbent Democratic-NPL U.S. Senator Byron Dorgan won re-election to a second term.

Major candidates

Democratic 
 Byron Dorgan, incumbent U.S. Senator

Republican 
 Donna Nalewaja, State Senator

Campaign 
Nalewaja's campaign focused on the suggestion that Dorgan had served in the United States Congress for nearly 20 years, and had accomplished relatively little. Dorgan and Nalewaja won the primary elections for their respective parties. McLain had previously run for this senate seat in 1980 against incumbent Mark Andrews.

Results

See also 
 1998 United States Senate elections

References

External links 
 1998 North Dakota U.S. Senate Election results

North Dakota
1998
United States Senate